Trudy is a diminutive of Gertrude. Notable people with the name include:

People 

 Trudy Adams (born 1964), American actress
 Trudy Anderson (born 1959), New Zealand cricketer
 Trudy Bellinger, British music video director
 Trudy Benson (born 1985), American painter
 Trudy Burke (born 1991), Australian association football player
 Trudy Camilleri (born 1991), Australian football player
 Trudy H. Clark (born 1951), United States Air Force major general
 Trudy Coxe (born 1949), American environmental activist
 Trudy Desmond (1945–1999), American singer
 Trudy Dittmar (born 1944), American writer
 Trudy Ederle (1905–2003), American swimmer
 Trudy Elion (1918–1999), American biochemist
 Trudy Larkin Förster (1935–2005), American writer
 Trudy Govier, Canadian philosopher
 Trudy Grant, Canadian television producer
 Trudy Groenman (born 1944), Dutch tennis player
 Trudy Harris (born 1949), American author
 Trudy Harrison (born 1976), British politician
 Trudy Haynes (1926–2022), American reporter
 Trudy Hellier, Australian actress
 Trudy Kerr (born 1963), Australian teacher
 Trudy Kilkolly (born 1965), New Zealand Olympic athlete
 Trudy Lynn (born 1947), American singer
 Trudy Mackay (born 1952), Canadian author
 Trudy Marshall (1920–2004), American actress
 Trudy McCaffery (1944–2007), thoroughbred racehorse owner and breeder
 Trudy McFall, American non-profit executive
 Trudy McIntosh (born 1984), Australian artistic gymnast
 Trudy Morgan (born 1966), African civil engineer
 Trudy Norris-Grey, Welsh businesswoman
 Trudy Huskamp Peterson (born 1945), American archivist
 Trudy Pitts (1932–2010), American jazz singer
 Trudy Richards (1920–2008), American singer
 Trudy Ruth (born 1950), Dutch sprinter
 Trudy Silver (born 1953), American composer
 Trudy Späth-Schweizer (1908–1990), Swiss political figure
 Trudy Stevenson (1944–2018), Zimbabwean politician and ambassador to Senegal
 Trudy Wade (born 1951), American politician
 Trudy Wroe (1931–2007), American actress
 Trudy Young (born 1950), Canadian actress

Fictional characters 

 Trudy, from Disney Comics
 Trudy Chacón, from Avatar (2009 film)
 Trudy, from the TV series The Tribe
 Trudy Monk, from the TV series Monk
 Trudy Joplin, from the TV series Miami Vice
 Trudy Campbell, from the TV series Mad Men
 Trudy Proud, from the TV series The Proud Family
 Deputy Trudy Wiegel, from the TV series Reno 911!
 Trudy, the eponymous lady of the track "Trudy" from Charlie Daniels' debut album Charlie Daniels (album)

See also
 Trudie

English-language feminine given names
English feminine given names
Scottish feminine given names
Welsh feminine given names